The Church of St. Nicholas in Tolmachi is both a Russian Orthodox house church and museum that is part of the State Tretyakov Gallery located in Moscow. The church is home to several religious relics and icons, including the culturally important Our Lady of Vladimir.

First mentioned in 1625 when it was a wooden church, it has since been reconstructed and restored several times. The church was ultimately closed in 1929 and became a neglected art storage house. Liturgical services were resumed after a unique arrangement between the Patriarchate and gallery were agreed to in 1993.

Background

Affiliations 
As a house church, the Church of St. Nicholas in Tolmachi is affiliated with both the State Tretyakov Gallery and the Moscow Patriarchate. The modern church acts as both a parish for the gallery's employees and as a museum open to the public; while active services are still held in the church, visitors can only enter the church through the Tretyakov Gallery, and religious artifacts are preserved in special climate-controlled environments.

Within the Russian Orthodox Church, the church is under  and the Urban Diocese of Moscow.

Name 
The church's name derives from the Old Tolmachi settlement of Tatar translators located in what is now  in Moscow. These translators originally had migrated to the area in order to serve the Golden Horde during the time of the Tatar Yoke.

History

Beginnings 
The initial version of the church was wooden, and it is in this state that the first mention of the church is made in a 1625 parish book. In March 1687, Patriarch Joachim visited the church for mass which generally indicated the parish had nobles and highly regarded individuals as members. In 1697, a parishioner of the Resurrection Church in Kadashi, Longin Dobrynin, built the five-domed stone church in place of the wooden one.

On the effort of Ekaterina Lazarevna Demidova, the Pokrovsky chapel was erected in 1770. Demidova was a widow, and she had sought to consecrate a chapel in the name of the Virgin Mary despite the ban on consecrating altars in her name. At the time, the Russian Orthodox Church preferred those honoring Mary to dedicate to one of her feast days. Demidova chose to dedicate to the Feast of the Intercession instead, and the chapel was dedicated the same year it was built. However, in commemoration of her initial desire for the temple to honor Mary; "Satisfy My Sorrows", which was the icon Demidova had originally wanted for the chapel, was later installed.

Misfortune and eventual closure 
It was around this time that the church's parish was hit with tragedy twice over. Firstly, during the time of the chapel's construction, the 1770–1772 Russian plague had caused much destruction in its wake. Secondly, during the French invasion of Russia much of the surrounding buildings were destroyed in a fire as Moscow was razed. Though the Church of St. Nicholas itself survived in principle, this was not without cost. The priest at the time, John Andreev, was killed by the invading French forces while trying to protect it.

With the permission of metropolitan bishop Philaret of Moscow, a new bell tower was added in 1834 along with a reconstructed refectory. In the prior year, the old bell tower had proven to be deficient after more than 150 years of use, so Philaret approved the request by the parish to install the new one as well as begin general reconstruction on the main building so long as the main church remain "in an ancient dispensation". For this task, the services of the premier architect F. M. Shestakov, who helped to build the Greater Church of the Ascension, were successfully sought. When the new bell tower and refectory were completed, Philaret delivered a sermon to consecrate the Church of St. Nicholas. Though they would not last, the walls at this time were lined with artificial marble, but due to persistent staining they had to be covered up with wall paintings.

The general reconstruction of the church would last more than 20 years until October 1858.

Several years after the Russian Revolution, the church was in a poor state of affairs under the Soviet rule. Following the death of the former rector of the church, Elder Alexy Zosimovsky, the church closed down in the Easter of 1929. It was soon transferred to the Tretyakov Gallery which used the church as a storehouse and let it come under disrepair. The top of the bell tower became broken, and bells separated into pieces. By the time the gallery began major restoration work on the church in 1983, the temple had remained empty for over 50 years. Yet by the turn of the decade, the bell tower was able to be fully restored.

Reopening 
It was not until 1993 that the temple was reopened for worship after an arrangement was made between the Russian Orthodox Church and the state gallery.

In September 1996, the church's restored main altar was sanctified by the Patriarch of Moscow and all Rus' Alexy II. A year later, restorations for the building were completed, and it became an active house church almost exactly 300 years after it was first constituted in stone. Security improvements to store and display art were added during this process, and an underground passageway was additionally made to connect it to the State Tretyakov Gallery.

Recent usage 

In 2009, the icon "Iverskaya" was transferred to the church from the gallery. It had been previously located within the Iverskaya Chapel before it was destroyed in 1929. The Trinity is stored in the church as well during the Feast for Holy Trinity. On 12 December 2012, the Tretyakov Gallery elected to transfer the relics of more than 30 saints to the church.

The church is most famously home to the Russian icon known as Our Lady of Vladimir. The icon is generally considered to be one of the most cherished symbols in Russian history.

, Archpriest Nikolai Sokolov is the rector for the Church of St. Nicholas in Tolmachi.

See also 
 St. Nicholas Church (disambiguation) – for a list of churches dedicated to Saint Nicholas the Wonderworker
 List of churches in Moscow  – for a list of churches within Moscow

References 

Russian Orthodox churches in Moscow
Tretyakov Gallery
Tourist attractions in Moscow
1996 establishments in Russia
17th-century Eastern Orthodox church buildings
Churches completed in 1997
Cultural heritage monuments of federal significance in Moscow
Rebuilt churches in Russia
17th-century churches in Russia
20th-century churches in Russia
20th-century Eastern Orthodox church buildings